James Ferrier may refer to:

James Frederick Ferrier (1808–1864), Scottish metaphysical writer
James Ferrier (politician) (1800–1888), mayor of Montreal from 1845 to 1846
Jim Ferrier (1915–1986), Australian golfer
Jim Ferrier (footballer), New Zealand international football (soccer) player